List of all members of the Storting in the period 1965 to 1969.  The list includes all those initially elected to the Storting.

There were a total of 150 representatives, distributed among the parties: 68 to Norwegian Labour Party,
31 to Conservative Party of Norway, 18 to Centre Party (Norway), 18 to Venstre (Norway), 13 to
Christian Democratic Party of Norway and 2 to Socialist Left Party.

Aust-Agder

Vest-Agder

Akershus

Bergen

Buskerud

Finnmark

Hedmark

Hordaland

Møre and Romsdal

Nordland

Oppland

Oslo

Rogaland

Sogn and Fjordane

Telemark

Troms

Nord-Trøndelag

Sør-Trøndelag

Vestfold

Østfold

 
Parliament of Norway, 1965–69